Kendriya Vidyalaya Hebbal, is a school in Bangalore and part of the Kendriya Vidyalayas in India. It was started in 1965. The school is affiliated to the Central Board of Secondary Education.

The school has classes from I to XII with an enrollment of 2800. It has maintained a 100% pass percentage record in class X for seven consecutive years.

Apart from academics, the school encourages students to participate in extra-curricular activities, competitions and games and sports events organized by the KV Sangathan and other schools at national level.

KVH is also one of the few schools in India to get accredited by the Quality Council of India (QCI) and the National Accreditation Board for Education and Training (NABET). It has signed an MoU with QCI for promoting quality education in Kendriya Vidyalayas across India.

Campus 
The school won the Lal Bagh Botanical Garden award for the best garden for six consecutive years. There are trees and flowering plants all around the campus. The main building of the school is a large open-centered pentagon. At the center of the pentagon is an assembly ground.

Rain water harvesting is practiced in campus. The campus has staff quarters and a play area to accommodate the faculty and their families.

KVH is one of the few chosen Kendriya Vidyalayas to have upgraded to E-Classroom and e-Learning teaching process with the implementation of Smart Boards in the classrooms.

Faculty 
The school has 73 teaching staff members, in three categories: post-graduate teachers (PGTs), trained graduate teachers (TGTs) and primary teachers (PRTs).

Student activities 
The school encourages the students to take part in national level competitions and examinations to increase their exposure and also conducts workshops to update the students with information in the fields of Science, Humanities and Commerce.

A few student activities are listed below :
 Educational Trips
 Green Olympiad
 Mathematics Olympiad 
 National Level Essay and Painting Competitions
 National Talent Search Exam
 Scouting activities 
 Think Quest
 Youth Parliament
 National Cyber Olympiad 
 National Science Olympiad
 International Mathematics Olympiad
Mock parliament sessions
British council incentives 
 
For CCA activities and house contests, the students are placed into four houses: Shivaji (red), Tagore (green), Ashoka (yellow) and Raman (blue). Earlier, there used to be five houses, the fifth one being Subhash with house colour orange.

Campus learning aids and facilities 
Campus learning facilities are listed below :
 4Mbit/s campus broadband access.
 Art Room.
Atal Tinkering Lab.
 Audio Visual Room with OHP, LCD projectors and Smart Boards.
 Computer labs (two).
 Intel Technology Aided Learning (TAL) Project.
 Junior Science Lab (one) for classes taught by science TGTs.
 Library of  20,000 volumes of books and 30 national and international publications.
 Resources Rooms (two), for primary and secondary students.
 Science Labs (three) for secondary and higher students.
 Sports Room, Music Room and Dance Room. 
 Student Activity Room with recreational facilities.

Sports activities 

The school organises a sports day annually in which the Houses take part in intra-school sports events.
The school has won many trophies in Football, Cricket, Athletics and other games at the regional and national levels.

The school consists of three Children Parks which provide recreation to the primary students.

KVH is equipped with sports facilities which are shown in the table below :

Alumni  
The school has an alumni association that meets annually in the school campus on the eve of the Indian Independence Day.

Gallery

See also 

 Central Board of Secondary Education
 Kendriya Vidyalaya
 List of Kendriya Vidyalayas
 NCERT

References

External links 

Kendriya Vidyalaya Sangathan
KV Regional Office Bangalore
 
Sakshat

Kendriya Vidyalayas in Bangalore